Armenian religion may refer to:

 Religion in Armenia
 Armenian Apostolic Church, the national church of Armenia
 Armenian mythology, pre-Christian Armenian religious belief